The Boy Scout Building, formerly called the Elebash Center, Inc. for Boy Scouts and Girl Scouts, is an historic building located in Miraflores Park (formerly Havana Park) in Pensacola, Florida.

Background 
Built in 1934 by the Civilian Conservation Corps for the Boy Scouts of America, by 1965, the building was in poor condition. It was restored in the 1970s by the Bream Fisherman Association. Today, it is used as a community gathering place.

In June 2021, as a group of Boy Scouts were cleaning the building, they found human remains in a crawl space underneath the building. Members of the University of West Florida Historic Trust later found a map dating to 1884 that denoted a graveyard in the area. It is believed that the graveyard was for black residents and a park was later developed on the land.

References

External links
 

1934 establishments in Florida
Buildings and structures in Pensacola, Florida
National Register of Historic Places in Escambia County, Florida
Southern Region (Boy Scouts of America)
Scout halls